The 2006–07 season is the 126th season in the existence of FC Girondins de Bordeaux and the club's 44th consecutive season in the top-flight of French football. In addition to the domestic league, Bordeaux participated in this season's editions of the Coupe de France, the Coupe de la Ligue, the UEFA Champions League and UEFA Cup.

First-team squad
Squad at end of season

Left club during season

Competitions

Overview

Ligue 1

League table

Results summary

Results by round

Matches

Coupe de France

Coupe de la Ligue

Champions League

Group stage

UEFA Cup

Knockout phase

Round of 32

Notes and references

Notes

References

Bordeaux
FC Girondins de Bordeaux seasons